The Battle for the Republic of China is a 1981 Taiwanese drama film directed by Ting Shan-hsi. The film was selected as the Taiwanese entry for the Best Foreign Language Film at the 55th Academy Awards, but was not accepted as a nominee. It won the Golden Horse Award for Best Feature Film in 1982.

See also
 List of submissions to the 55th Academy Awards for Best Foreign Language Film
 List of Taiwanese submissions for the Academy Award for Best Foreign Language Film

References

External links
 

1981 films
1980s war drama films
Taiwanese war drama films
1980s Mandarin-language films
Central Motion Picture Corporation films
Films directed by Ting Shan-hsi
1981 drama films